Hector's House (French La Maison de Toutou) is a French children's television series using glove puppets.  It was first broadcast in France on 1ère chaine on 27 October 1966 and ran over seven series and 78 episodes. It was re-voiced in English and broadcast on BBC1 on 9 September 1968 and repeated throughout the 1970s.  Each episode lasted 5 minutes and it was regularly given the pre-six o'clock time slot that brought children's programmes to a close.

It was written and performed by Georges Croses with puppeteers Agnès Vannier and Georges Tournaire, using 60 cm (2') tall puppets on a garden set.  The English version followed the French script faithfully with minor deviations.

Characters and setting
Affable, but sometimes pompous, Hector the dog lives in a house with a beautiful garden.  He is a proud gardener and handyman, never far from his tool shed. The motherly, but mischievous, Zsazsa the cat lives with him.  Kiki the frog is a neighbour and constant visitor to the garden through a hole in the garden wall.  She claims to be a meteorologist.

The original French characters of Zsazsa and Kiki were the similarly named Zouzou and Kiki, with Hector being the titular Toutou (literally "Doggie").

Hector desires order and tranquillity, and is always thinking up ways to improve himself and his garden.  He is willing to assist his two friends in their activities, but often finds them at odds with his own.  Kiki and Zsazsa also often play tricks on him.  But he always takes this in good humour, and ends each episode breaking the fourth wall to address the camera with his catchphrase: "I'm a great big [whatever he was] old Hector."

Although named after the house, all stories occur in the garden and action within the house is only seen through the open windows.

The humour employed is indebted to the French film comedies of Jacques Tati who often portrayed a man strangely at odds with his surroundings.

Credits
The programme was broadcast entirely without credits, featuring only a short introductory theme tune, (with birdsong accompaniment) and, in the French broadcasts, a short static frame at the end (with the same bird).

French
Actor Jacques Morel voiced Toutou, Actress Lucie Dolène voiced Zouzou and puppeteer Agnes Vannier was Kiki.

English
Hector was voiced by Paul Bacon.  Kiki was voiced by Denise Bryer, who also had roles in Noddy, Terrahawks and Labyrinth.    An urban myth circulated for some time that ZsaZsa was voiced by Joanna Lumley, due to her similar voice and accent, but this has been denied by the actress.

Music
The theme music, of which two versions were aired, was composed by Francis Lai.

Video and DVD
A number of VHS and DVDs have since been released with a selection of episodes across the series in no particular order.
 VHS 1993 - 60min - Polygram Video "Pocket Money Video"
 DVD 2001 - 30 Episodes - Contender

Episodes
The BBC episodes were not shown in the same order as the original French series.

Series One

Series Two

Series Three

Series Four

Series Five

Series Six

Series Seven

References

1960s British children's television series
1970s British children's television series
1960s French television series
1970s French television series
1965 French television series debuts
1968 British television series debuts
1970 French television series endings
1975 British television series endings
BBC children's television shows
British television shows featuring puppetry
French television shows featuring puppetry
English-language television shows